Bucculatrix coronatella is a moth in the family Bucculatricidae. The species was described in 1860 by James Brackenridge Clemens. It is found in North America, where it has been recorded from Alabama, Georgia, Indiana, Kentucky, Maine, Maryland, Massachusetts, New Jersey, Ohio, Oklahoma, Ontario, Pennsylvania, South Carolina, Tennessee, Virginia, Washington D.C. and West Virginia.

The wingspan is 7.5–8 mm. The forewings are uniform orange-ocherous or sometimes brownish. The hind wings are grey or pale reddish fuscous. Adults have been recorded on wing from April to September.

The larvae feed on Betula nigra. They mine the leaves of their host plant. The mine is thread-like and irregularly winding. It is filled with blackish frass. Older larvae live freely, feeding on the underside of the leaf. Mature larvae are pale green with a reddish tinge. Pupation takes place in a pale to brownish ocherous cocoon.

References

External links 
Natural History Museum Lepidoptera generic names catalog

Bucculatricidae
Moths described in 1860
Taxa named by James Brackenridge Clemens
Moths of North America